Helen Bonchek Schneyer (January 10, 1921 in New York City – July 16, 2005 in Barre, Vermont) was an American folk musician. She was raised Jewish in New York City. While a student at Columbia University, she was introduced to American folk music. She also sang Baptist spirituals.

Over a sixty-year career, Schneyer worked with such influential artists as Pete Seeger and Woody Guthrie. Later in life, Schneyer frequently appeared on A Prairie Home Companion as well as at many folk festivals.

External links 
 Washington Post Obituary
 Times Argus Obituary

1921 births
2005 deaths
American folk singers
Jewish American musicians
Deaths from cancer in Vermont
Singers from New York City
People from Washington County, Vermont
20th-century American singers
Jewish folk singers
20th-century American women singers
20th-century American Jews
Columbia University alumni
21st-century American Jews
21st-century American women